Chirkutt is a Bangladeshi rock band from Dhaka, formed in 2002. It consists of vocalist Sharmin Sultana Sumi, guitarist Emon Chowdhury, keyboards player Jahid Nirob and drummer Pavel Areen.

History
This band was formed in 2002 by Sharmin Sultana Sumi. Emon Chowdhury joined in 2005, Pavel Areen joined in 2008 and Jahid Nirob joined in 2015. Eight years after the band was formed they released their first album Chirkuttnama.

Chirkutt's performed at SXSW-2016 in Austin, USA and South Asian Band Festival-Delhi, India, the President house concert in India-2014, India Music Week and the Jaffna Music Festival, Sri Lanka. They were also the winners of the RTV Best Band Award 2012. Chirkutt band has also embarked for a tour in Norway with Norwegian rockers Casa Murilo in 2013. They performed on Asian TV music show in September 2016.

Members

Present members
 Sharmin Sultana Sumi – lead vocals
 Emon Chowdhury – lead guitars
 Jahid Nirob – keyboards
 Pavel Areen – drums

Discography
 "চিরকুটনামা (Chronograph)" (2010)
 "যাদুর শহর (City of Magic)" (2013)
 "উধাও (Disappear)" (2017)

Award

Channel i Music Awards

|-
| 2013 || "যাদুর শহর (City of Magic)" || Best Band Album of the Year || 

RTV Music Awards

|-
| 2012 || Chirkutt || Best Band of the Year || 

SAARC Film Festival Award 

|-
| 2016 || Jalal's Story || Best Original Score ||

Chirkutt in film
The band has also worked on several local film music director. They won the "SAARC" film festival award in 2016 for the best original score of the film Jalal's Story. Chirkutt also have done the playback in the movies Television, and Piprabidya, of director Mostofa Sarwar Farooki. They did the soundtrack of Aynabaji of Amitabh Reza Chowdhury 2016 film, Ice cream of Redowan Rony. Chirkutt did the soundtrack of the movie Tumi Je Amar by RTV. They composed the soundtrack of the 2017 movie Doob – No bed of roses.

References

External links
 Official Website
 Official Facebook
 BBC Music 

Musical groups established in 2002
2002 establishments in Bangladesh
Bangladeshi pop music groups